Cosmo is a chain of 19 buffet restaurants in the United Kingdom. Its branches in Valley Retail, Leisure Park and Croydon, were formerly the largest restaurants in the United Kingdom. The chain currently operates 26 restaurants. 18 are located in England, 4 in Scotland, and 1 each in Wales, Ireland, and Northern Ireland.

The restaurants include live cooking stations where customers can have food freshly cooked.

History
The first Cosmo restaurant opened in Eastbourne in 2003. Between 2003 and June 2012, Cosmo opened in Bristol, Chatham, Coventry, Croydon, Margate, Romford, Royal Tunbridge Wells, Wolverhampton, and Swansea. At the time the Croydon branch opened in November of 2011, it was Britain's biggest restaurant, with a seating capacity of 800. In July 2012, Cosmo opened restaurants in Reading, Aberdeen and Belfast.

In 2015, Cosmo was officially voted third in the CGA Peach Brand Track Survey for "Customer Satisfaction" and 2nd for "Value for Money". In 2016, it opened restaurants in Oxford, Dublin and Southampton. Its branch in Oxford won very positive reviews. The Oxford Mail said: "Cosmo definitely has the wow factor" (June 23, 2016) while monthly glossy OX Magazine said: "There is serious fun and genuinely great food to be had" (August 2016).

Menu
The restaurant serves up more than 150 dishes from around the world, including China, Japan, Korea, Malaysia, Thailand, Mongolia, Singapore, Vietnam, England, and India. Examples of dishes include sushi, sweet and sour pork, pizza, salmon filet in black bean sauce and Chicken Korma.

Locations

England

Scotland
 Aberdeen
 Edinburgh
 Glasgow

Wales 

 Cardiff

Northern Ireland
 Belfast

Ireland
Dublin

Former locations
 Coventry
 Croydon
 Margate
 Swansea
 York

References

External links

 Official website

Restaurant groups in the United Kingdom
Restaurants established in 2003